The 1930–31 season was the 54th Scottish football season in which Dumbarton competed at national level, entering the Scottish Football League and the Scottish Cup.  In addition Dumbarton competed in the Dumbartonshire Cup.

Scottish League

In their ninth consecutive season in the Second Division, things were looking bright for Dumbarton's league challenge, as at the turn of the year they were lying only a point behind a promotion place. However a run of 5 straight defeats in January 1931 snuffed out these hopes and in the end Dumbarton finished a midtable 10th out of 20, with 38 points - 23 behind champions Third Lanark.

Scottish Cup

Dumbarton were knocked out in the first round by Aberdeen.

Dumbartonshire Cup
Dumbarton retained the Dumbartonshire Cup, again beating Clydebank in the final, with Willie Parlane scoring all five goals.

Friendlies
Elsewhere 3 friendly matches were played, including a match against a Rangers XI and two trial matches for the Dumbartonshire Juniors.  Of these matches, there was 1 win and 2 losses, scoring 4 goals for the loss of 4.

Player statistics

|}

Source:

International Caps
Stewart Lennie and Willie Parlane earned their first amateur caps playing for Scotland against Wales and England respectively in the Amateur Home Internationals.

Transfers

Players in

Players out 

In addition William Hyslop, William Kirk, William Livingston and Archibald McLardie all played their last games in Dumbarton 'colours'.

Source:

References

Dumbarton F.C. seasons
Scottish football clubs 1930–31 season